Olhalvo is a  parish of the municipality of Alenquer, in western Portugal. Its population in 2011 was 1,907. Olhalvo has an area of 8.30 km².

Heritage 
Significant buildings include:

 Church of "Nossa Senhora da Encarnação", XVII century.
 Convent of Carmelitas Descalços" construction began in 1646, and has been under private ownership since 1941.
 Chapel of "Senhor dos Aflitos", belonged to "Recolhimento de Nossa Senhora da Conceição", in 1663. It was sold to private owners in 1873.
 Cruzeiro
 Fontain

Olhalvo supports many cultural activities; the following groups are active:

 A Philharmonic Band, "Banda da Sociedade Filarmónica Olhalvense", SFO, started activity in 1918

 Folk dance group "O Rancho Folclorico", since 1978, also within SFO
 Folk dance group "A Associação Recreativa da Pocariça", also active in sports
 Samba School, "Escola de Samba de Penafirme da Mata"
 Folk music group "Noses com Vozes", within "Associação Alegres Olhares" related to traditional music.

Special events 

 Pilgrimage from Olhalvo to Nazaré, "Círio de Olhalvo à Nossa Senhora da Nazaré"–started in the sixteenth century. It occurs each year in September, organized by the inhabitants of Olhalvand, Penafirme da Mata e Pocariça in rotation.
 Singing to the kings "Cantar dos Reis", on the night of 5 January a group of men sings in the streets a theme related to the kings visiting the newborn Jesus. Small paintings are made in the houses wishing a good year to the people.
 Annual festivities occur in September at Olhalvo's main square.

Localities within Olhalvo parish 

Besides Olhalvo it self:

 Penafirme da Mata
 Casais da Lage
 Cruzeiro
 Pousoa
 Pocariça
 Casal Perdigoto
 Casal Das Surraipas

References

Parishes of Alenquer, Portugal